Jonah Barrington is the name of:

 Jonah Barrington (judge) (1760–1834), Irish judge and memoirist
 Jonah Barrington (journalist) (1904–1986), pen name of Cyril Carr Dalmain, who coined the term Lord Haw Haw
 Jonah Barrington (squash player) (born 1941), Irish/English squash player